Samuel Jones may refer to:

Politics
 Samuel Jones (English politician) (1610–1673), MP 1656 and 1660
 Samuel Jones-Loyd, 1st Baron Overstone (1796–1883), British banker and politician
 Samuel Jones (New York comptroller) (1734–1819)
 Samuel Jones (chancellor) (1769–1853), Chancellor of New York, 1826–1828
 Samuel Jones (Massachusetts politician) (1778–1862)
 Samuel J. Jones ( 1820– 1880), sheriff, Kansas Territory, US
 Samuel S. Jones (Utah politician) (1837–1923)
 Samuel S. Jones (Wisconsin politician) (1854–1912)
 Samuel M. Jones (1846–1904), "Golden Rule Jones," American businessman and politician
 Samuel A. Jones (1861–?), New York politician

Religion
 Samuel Jones (nonconformist) (1628–1697), Welsh  clergyman
 Samuel Jones (academy tutor) (1681/2–1719), English Dissenter
 Samuel Porter Jones (1847–1906), American evangelist

Sports
 Samuel Jones (footballer, born 1866) (1866–?), Welsh international
 Samuel Jones (footballer, born 1870) (1870–?), Welsh international
 Samuel Jones (footballer, born 1955), English professional
 Samuel Jones (athlete) (1880–1954), American high jumper
 Samuel Jones (bowls) (1867–1944), English

Other
 Samuel Jones (composer) (born 1935), American
 Samuel Jones (Confederate Army officer) (1819–1887)
 Samuel Maurice Jones,  Welsh painter
 Samuel Levi Jones, American artist

See also 
 Sam Jones (disambiguation), includes Sammy
 Samantha Jones (disambiguation)